The 2017 Rally Poland was the eighth round of the 2017 World Rally Championship and was the 74th running of the Rally Poland. Thierry Neuville and Nicolas Gilsoul won the rally.

Ole Christian Veiby won the WRC-2 category for the first time, with WRC-2 championship leader Pontus Tidemand finishing second.

Entry list

Classification

Event standings

Special stages

Power Stage
The Power Stage was a  stage at the end of the rally.

Championship standings after the rally

Drivers' Championship standings

Manufacturers' Championship standings

References

External links
 The official website of the World Rally Championship

2017
2017 World Rally Championship season
2017 in Polish sport
June 2017 sports events in Europe
July 2017 sports events in Europe